Chef Menteur is associated with several place names in eastern New Orleans and South Louisiana, including Chef Menteur Pass, Bayou Chef Menteur and Chef Menteur Highway (U.S. Highway 90 in Louisiana).

Etymology
Proposed etymologies for the phrase have varied, and the origin was obscure as early as the late nineteenth century.  The literal meaning of "Chef Menteur" is "Lying chief" in the French language; most etymologies describe the phrase as originating amongst the Choctaw, in whose language the equivalent is "oulabe mingo."  One book from 1891 describes the origin as follows:

More modern accounts describe the term as referring either to Kerlerec or the Mississippi River.  In the case of the former, the name originates after the French Empire, represented by Kerlerec, reneged on a treaty.  In the case of the latter, "lying" is used metaphorically, to describe the twisting and turning of the unregulated and unstable river's path through the delta.

References